John Martin Poyer (1861 – May 12, 1922) was the Naval Governor of American Samoa, from March 1, 1915, to June 10, 1919. He held the longest term of any American governor appointed over the territory by the United States Government. A Naval Academy graduate, Poyer served in numerous positions and retired in 1906 on account of failing health; however, the navy recalled him to service in 1915 to serve as governor. During the 1918 flu pandemic, Poyer quarantined the territory to stop the spread of the pandemic to American Samoa. Because of his actions, no deaths occurred in American Samoa, and he received the Navy Cross. Upon his final retirement, Poyer had reached the rank of commander.

Life and career

Early life
Poyer was born in Indiana in 1861. He was appointed to the United States Naval Academy from Wisconsin in October 1879.

Naval career
Poyer became an ensign in February 1884, a lieutenant (junior grade) in December 1894. He was stationed to the Washington Navy Yard from 1892 to 1894, the USS Montgomery from August 1894 to 1897, the Naval War College  in June 1897, back to the Washington Ship Yard from 1897 to 1898, and the USS Saint Paul. He became a lieutenant in May 1898. Poyer retired from active duty on June 30, 1906, on account of ill-health as a lieutenant commander, but was brought back to active duty to become Governor of American Samoa.

Governorship
On March 1, 1915, Poyer relieved Lieutenant Charles Armijo Woodruff and became the twelfth Governor of American Samoa, the eleventh man to hold the office. He is one of only three men to hold the office of naval governor after having already retired from the navy. As governor, Poyer ended prohibition of alcohol in the territory. During the 1918 flu pandemic, Poyer quarantined American Samoa after hearing news reports of worldwide deaths on the radio. This action caused American Samoa to be one of the few places in the world to not suffer any flu deaths. Angered by the quarantine of ships, Lieutenant Colonel Robert Logan of the New Zealand Army, administrator of Western Samoa, cut off communications with American Samoa. For his leadership in preventing the spread of Spanish influenza, Poyer received the Navy Cross.

Poyer transferred command of American Samoa to Warren Jay Terhune on June 10, 1919, ending his governorship. His term is the longest of any naval governor of American Samoa. After his retirement, Poyer lived in Washington, D.C. until his death. He was buried at Arlington National Cemetery.

References

1861 births
1922 deaths
Governors of American Samoa
United States Naval Academy alumni
Spanish flu
United States Navy officers
Prohibition in the United States
Military personnel from Indiana
People from Washington, D.C.
Recipients of the Navy Cross (United States)
Burials at Arlington National Cemetery